In telecommunications, register signaling provides addressing information, such as the calling and/or called telephone number.  R2 register signaling is an example.

This is contrasted with line signaling.

References 

Telephony signals